is a Japanese table tennis player.

Life and career

1993–2010: Early life and background
Yoshimura was born in Ibaraki Prefecture to a Filipina mother and a Japanese father. His first name is a Japanese transliteration of the Tagalog word "Mahal", meaning "beloved".

2011–present
In 2011, while in junior high school, he competed in the February Table Tennis Tournament Japan where he advanced to the top 12. He defeated Kazuhiro Zhang in the semi-finals but lost to Jun Mizutani in the final game. His achievements include the Asian Championships (New Delhi, India; the first victory of a Japanese player in the men's singles) and the All Japan Table Tennis Championships. At the 2015 World Table Tennis Championships, Yoshimura won a silver medal in the mixed doubles event with Kasumi Ishikawa. At the 2017 World Table Tennis Championships, Yoshimura won a gold medal in the mixed doubles event with Kasumi Ishikawa.

Career records
Japan Top 12 Table Tennis Tournament (2011)
Men's singles runner-up
World Junior Table Tennis Championships (2011)
3rd in men's singles 
3rd in men's doubles
Interscholastic athletic competition (2011)
Men's doubles winner
3rd in men's singles table tennis
Asian Junior Table Tennis Championships (2011)
Men's doubles runner up
Won men's singles
All Japan Table Tennis Championships (2012)
Won the men's singles
Japan Open (2015)
Men's singles runner-up

In popular culture
Maharu Yoshimura had a minor role in the 2017 film Mixed Doubles.

In a 2016 segment of the Japanese variety show Ningen Kansatsu Variety Monitoring (ニンゲン観察バラエティ モニタリング), Yoshimura and Koki Niwa disguised themselves as two old men and proceeded to shock normal folks in table tennis.

References

External links
Official Website

1993 births
Living people
Sportspeople from Ibaraki Prefecture
Japanese people of Filipino descent
Japanese male table tennis players
Table tennis players at the 2016 Summer Olympics
Olympic medalists in table tennis
Olympic silver medalists for Japan
Olympic table tennis players of Japan
Medalists at the 2016 Summer Olympics
Universiade medalists in table tennis
World Table Tennis Championships medalists
Universiade silver medalists for Japan
Medalists at the 2013 Summer Universiade
Aichi Institute of Technology alumni
21st-century Japanese people